The 1992 UAB Blazers football team represented the University of Alabama at Birmingham (UAB) as an independent during the 1992 NCAA Division III football season. It was the second team fielded by the school. Led by second-year head coach Jim Hilyer, the Blazers compiled a record of 7–3. They played four of their home games at Legion Field in and one at Lawson Field, both located in Birmingham, Alabama. UAB moved to the NCAA Division I-AA—now known as NCAA Division I Football Championship Subdivision (FCS)—level in 1993.

Schedule

References

UAB
UAB Blazers football seasons
UAB Blazers football